The 1969 Australian Formula 2 Championship was a CAMS sanctioned Australian motor racing title open to racing cars complying with Australian Formula 2. The title, which was the third Australian Formula 2 Championship, was contested concurrently with the 1969 Sam Hordern Memorial Trophy which was staged at Warwick Farm in New South Wales, Australia on 7 December 1969. The championship was won by Max Stewart driving a Mildren Waggott.

Results

Note: The 1969 Sam Hordern Memorial Trophy, which incorporated the 1969 Australian Formula 2 Championship, was a round of the 1969 Australian Drivers' Championship. It was open to both Australian National Formula cars and Australian Formula 2 cars, however the former were not eligible for the Australian Formula 2 Championship and thus are not included in the above table.

References

Further reading
 Jim Shepherd, A History of Australian Motor Sport, 1980

Australian Formula 2 Championship
Formula 2 Championship
Motorsport at Warwick Farm